Terry Ramadhani Kiunge, commonly referred to as Terry Kiunge, is a Kenyan businesswoman, human resource professional and corporate executive who was, in May 2022, appointed as the chief executive officer (CEO), at Kenya Medical Supplies Authority (KEMSA). Before her current position, she worked as the director of human resources at Aga Khan University, based in Nairobi, Kenya. She also previously served as a board member on the KEMSA board of directors.

Background and education
She was born in Kenya . She attended high school at Loretto High School, in Sacramento California, United States.
She holds a Bachelor of Education degree from Kenyatta University, in Kahawa, Nairobi, Kenya. Her Master of Business Administration degree was awarded by the University of Liverpool, in the United Kingdom. She graduated with a Certificate in Adaptive Leadership, from the Harvard Kennedy School. In addition, she is a certified project management professional and a member of the Chartered Institute of Personnel and Development (CIPD).

Career
Her business experience goes back almost 20 years, as of 2022.
She also worked for a period of time in the Executive Office of the President of Kenya, in the President's Delivery Unit. While there, she monitored and oversaw the "implementation of the national government's Health projects".

One of her assignments at the medical supplies agency is to oversee the streamlining, rationalization and downsizing of the staff numbers at the authority. She is the first substantive CEO at KEMSA, since Jonah Manjari was suspended in 2021, following procurement and other financial scandals at the agency during and following the COVID-19 pandemic.

See also
 Jennifer Karina
 Wanja Michuki
 Adema Sangale
 Risper Alaro

References

External links
 KEMSA Official Webpage

Living people
1979 births
21st-century Kenyan businesswomen
21st-century Kenyan businesspeople
Kenyan chief executives
Kenyatta University alumni
Alumni of the University of Liverpool
Harvard University alumni